Zvi Mowshowitz is a former professional Magic: The Gathering player who also held a developer intern position at Wizards of the Coast Magic R&D. He is known for having created innovative and sometimes game-breaking decks TurboZvi and My Fires. His first-place finishes include a Pro Tour and a Grand Prix. He has placed in the top eight of four Pro Tours, and earned over $140,000 playing Magic competitively. In 2007, Mowshowitz was elected into the Magic Hall of Fame.

Mowshowitz is also an avid internet writer, previously with The Dojo, Mindripper, Brainburst, StarCityGames, and then for the official Magic website MagicTheGathering.com. In April 2006, he stopped writing for MagicTheGathering.com.

Mowshowitz was the CEO of MetaMed, a medical research analysis firm.

Mowshowitz is the son of American biochemist Deborah Mowshowitz.

Mowshowitz is an alumnus of Columbia University and holds a Bachelor's Degree in Mathematics.

Top 8 appearances

Other accomplishments
 Magic Hall of Fame class of 2007

References

Further reading
 
 A kind of ‘Magic’: One nerd’s quest to shake up video games and create a $1 billion market (Fortune, 2020)

External links
 Zvi Mowshowitz’s blog, “Don’t Worry About the Vase”
 Zvi Mowshowitz’s old blog on LiveJournal

20th-century American Jews
American Magic: The Gathering players
Living people
Businesspeople from New York City
1979 births
American health care chief executives
Columbia College (New York) alumni
21st-century American Jews